Fran Brown (born 10 October 1984) is a British athlete. She is a two-time former paraclimbing world champion. She is the 2019 PTS2 world and European champion in paratriathlon.

Biography 
Brown grew up in Cornwall, attending Truro School. She studied lighting technology at Cardiff University and worked as deputy chief electrician for stage theatre productions in London. While at work, Brown suffered a 16-foot fall, dislocating three vertebrae in her neck.

Paraclimbing 
Brown, who had climbed as a child, returned to the sport after her injury. In 2012, she became the paraclimbing world champion, the first British person to hold the title.

Paratriathlon 
In 2018, Brown won the silver medal in her category at the ITU World Championships. In 2019, she became the paratriathlon world champion and European champion in the PTS2 category.

Results 
Brown's competition results are listed below. Unless indicated otherwise, the competitions are paratriathlons.

 DNF = Did not finish

 DNS = Did not start

 DSQ = Disqualified

References 

Living people
1984 births
People educated at Truro School
British female triathletes
Paratriathletes of Great Britain